Atlético Capitalino Fútbol Club is a Mexican professional football team based in Mexico City, Mexico currently playing in Liga de Balompié Mexicano.

History 
In June 2020, the Liga de Balompié Mexicano announced the existence of a project called Atlético Capitalino which would seek to lead a team representing the Mexican capital in this new competition. On June 29, the hiring of Eduardo Bacas as manager was announced. On July 3 the official foundation of the club was announced, in addition to being accepted as a franchise member of the Liga de Balompié Mexicano.

On May 16, 2022 Atlético Capitalino was expelled from the LBM for not complying with the rules of the competition.

Stadium 
The Estadio Municipal de Atitalaquía is a multi-use stadium in Atitalaquía, Hidalgo, Mexico.  It is currently used mostly for football matches. The stadium has a capacity of 1,500 people and hosts Liga de Balompié Mexicano and amateur soccer matches.

Previously, the club played its home matches in stadiums Jesús Martínez "Palillo" and Valentín González, both located in Mexico City.

Players

First-team squad

References 

Atlético Capitalino
Association football clubs established in 2020
2020 establishments in Mexico
Football clubs in Mexico City
Liga de Balompié Mexicano Teams